Henry Metcalf may refer to:

 Henry B. Metcalf (1829–1904), prohibitionist in the United States
 Henry C. Metcalf (1867–1942), American organizational theorist
 Henry Metcalf (rugby union) (1878–1966), South African rugby union player
 Henry Harrison Metcalf (1841–1932), American editor, journalist, historian and politician

See also
 Henry Metcalfe (disambiguation)